Kristiina is an Estonian and Finnish feminine given name. It is a cognate of the English and French given name Christine. Tiina is often used as a diminutive of Kristiina.

People named Kristiina include:
Kristiina Brask (born 1990), Finnish pop singer
Kristiina Ehin (born 1977), Estonian singer, poet and translator
Kristiina Elstelä (1943–2016), Finnish actress
Kristiina Halttu (born 1963), Finnish actress
Kristiina Kass (born 1970), Estonian children's writer and illustrator
Kristiina Kolehmainen (1956–2012), Finnish-Swedish librarian and translator
Kristiina Lassus (born 1966), Finnish product designer and interior architect
Kristiina Mäkelä (born 1992), Finnish athlete (triple jump)
Kristiina Mäki (born 1991), Finnish-born Czech runner
Kristiina Nurk (born 1972), Estonian underwater swimmer
Kristiina Ojuland (born 1966), Estonian politician
Kristiina Poska (born 1978), Estonian conductor
Kristiina Ross (born 1955), Estonian linguist and translator
Kristiina Rove (born 1990), Finnish alpine ski racer
Kristiina Tullus (born 1998), Estonian footballer
Kristiina Wegelius (born 1960), Finnish figure skater
Kristiina Wheeler (born 1983), English-Finnish singer

References

Estonian feminine given names
Finnish feminine given names